Gudas may refer to:

Locations
Gudas, Ariège, a commune in France
Gudas, Belgaum, a settlement in Belgaum district, India

Surname

Leo Gudas, a Czech hockey player
Radko Gudas, a Czech hockey player